ADB-CHMINACA (also known as MAB-CHMINACA) is an indazole-based synthetic cannabinoid. It is a potent agonist of the CB1 receptor with a binding affinity of Ki = 0.289 nM and was originally developed by Pfizer in 2009 as an analgesic medication. It was identified in cannabinoid blends in Japan in early 2015.

Side effects 

There have been a number of reported cases of deaths and hospitalizations in relation to this synthetic cannabinoid.

Legal status 
In the United States, ADB-CHMINACA is a Schedule I controlled substance.  Prior to its listing at the federal level in 2018, Louisiana placed ADB-CHMINACA on its Schedule I list by emergency scheduling in 2014.

Sweden's public health agency suggested to classify ADB-CHMINACA as hazardous substance on November 10, 2014.

ADB-CHMINACA is listed in the Fifth Schedule of the Misuse of Drugs Act (MDA) and therefore illegal in Singapore as of May 2015.

ADB-CHMINACA is illegal in Switzerland as of December 2015.

Metabolism 
Ten ADB-CHMINACA major metabolites were identified in several incubations with cryopreserved human hepatocytes. Most transformations occurred at the cyclohexylmethyl tail of the compound.

See also 

 5F-AB-PINACA
 5F-ADB
 5F-AMB
 5F-APINACA
 AB-FUBINACA
 AB-CHFUPYCA
 AB-CHMINACA
 AB-PINACA
 ADB-BINACA
 ADB-FUBINACA
 ADB-HEXINACA
 ADB-PINACA
 ADBICA
 APICA
 APINACA
 MDMB-CHMICA
 MDMB-CHMINACA
 MDMB-FUBINACA
 PX-3

References 

Cannabinoids
Designer drugs
Indazolecarboxamides
Cyclohexyl compounds
Carboxamides